Xavier Robic (born 17 November 1979) is a French actor and an alumnus of Cours Simon, an acting school in Paris, and the Studio Théâtre d'Asnières. He is most known for his role in the French television series, Spiral.

Filmography

Television

References

External links

Xavier Robic at AlloCiné 
Xavier Robic filmography at AlloCiné 

1979 births
Living people
French male actors